Vanina Vanini also known as The Betrayer is a 1961 Italian drama film directed by Roberto Rossellini. It is based on Stendhal's 1829 novella of the same name.

Plot

Cast
Sandra Milo ...  Vanina Vanini
Laurent Terzieff ...  Pietro Missirilli
Martine Carol ...  Contessa Vitelleschi
Paolo Stoppa...  Asdrubale Vanini
Isabelle Corey ...  Clelia
Antonio Pierfederici ...  Livio Savelli
Olimpia Cavalli ...  La femme de chambre
Nerio Bernardi ...  Cardinal Savelli
Mimmo Poli ...  Il boia
Claudia Bava
Leonardo Botta ...  Le confesseur
Nando Cicero ...  Saverio Pontini
Attilio Dottesio
Carlo Gazzabini
Enrico Glori
Jean Gruault ...  Le castrat
Evar Maran
Leonardo Severini
Nando Tamberlani

External links
 

1961 films
Italian historical drama films
1960s Italian-language films
1960s historical drama films
Films set in Rome
Films directed by Roberto Rossellini
Films based on works by Stendhal
Films set in the 1820s
1961 drama films
Films scored by Renzo Rossellini
1960s Italian films